Kayqubadiyya, was a palace built by the Rum Sultan Kayqubad I between 1224 and 1226. Located northwest of Kayseri, the place is now called Kiybad Ciftligi and sits near the plain of Mashhad. As a place to review the troops, the road, which proceeds past the palace, had been in use since pre-Roman times.

The palace was the favorite residence of Kayqubad I, and it was here that he received the capitulation of Malik al-Din Dawudshah, lord of Erzincan. In 1237, Kayqubad was holding a banquet at Kayqubadiyya and was poisoned and died. His son, Kaykhusraw II would ascend the throne at Kayqubadiyya following the execution of his brothers, Rukn al-Din and Kilic Arslan.

The palace was just one of many architectural foundations and monuments initiated by Kayqubad I. The site was excavated in 1964.

References

Sources
  

Buildings and structures of the Sultanate of Rum
Archaeological sites in Turkey
1964 archaeological discoveries
Kayseri Province
Palaces